Return of the Reaper is the 17th album by German heavy metal band Grave Digger, released on 11 July 2014 via Napalm Records. It is the final album to feature H.P. Katzenburg on keyboards.

The album cover was created by Gyula Havancsák of Hjules Illustration and Design, who has been responsible for all of the band's artworks since 2005's The Last Supper.

When given a description about the album, vocalist Chris Boltendahl cites the album stylistically reminiscent of Heavy Metal Breakdown, Witch Hunter and The Reaper.

Track listing

Charts

Personnel
 Chris Boltendahl - vocals
 Axel Ritt - guitars
 Jens Becker - bass
 Stefan Arnold - drums
 H.P. Katzenburg - keyboards

Production
 Gyula Havancsák - cover art

References

Grave Digger (band) albums
2014 albums
Napalm Records albums